Žakovce is a village and municipality in Kežmarok District in the Prešov Region of north Slovakia.

History
In historical records the village was first mentioned in 1209. It was a village inhabited by Carpathian Germans from its foundation till January 1945.

Geography
The municipality lies at an altitude of 671 meters and covers an area of 16.031 km².
It has a population of about 705 people.

Culture

Sources
 History Webpage by Thomas Reimer 
 Historical website, based on the 2009 Eisdorf-Book.
 "800 Jahre Eisdorf: Erstes deutsches Dorf unter der Hohen Tatra," Inge Schmidt, ed., (Bietigheim-Bissigheim: Arbeitsgemeinschaft Eisdorf, 2009). Published by the association of the pre-1945 inhabitants and their descendants. 
 "Osemstoročne Žakovce", Ivan Chalupecky & kol., Kežmarok: Vivit 2009. While the German book focuses on the 750 years of German life in Eisdorf, the Slovak book focuses more on the 50 years of Slovak/Ruthenian life of the new settlers, who mainly came from the village of Blažov, cleared to become part of the military training area of Javorina.  The two groups met in 2009 in a moving 800 year celebration.

External links

http://www.statistics.sk/mosmis/eng/run.html

Villages and municipalities in Kežmarok District